Ji Yoo-jin (born 6 July 1988) is a South Korean rower. She competed in the women's lightweight double sculls event at the 2008 Summer Olympics.

References

1988 births
Living people
South Korean female rowers
Olympic rowers of South Korea
Rowers at the 2008 Summer Olympics
Place of birth missing (living people)
Asian Games medalists in rowing
Rowers at the 2006 Asian Games
Rowers at the 2010 Asian Games
Rowers at the 2014 Asian Games
Rowers at the 2018 Asian Games
Asian Games gold medalists for South Korea
Asian Games silver medalists for South Korea
Asian Games bronze medalists for South Korea
Medalists at the 2010 Asian Games
Medalists at the 2014 Asian Games
Medalists at the 2018 Asian Games
20th-century South Korean women
21st-century South Korean women